Yau Mei Court is a Home Ownership Scheme court and government quarters in Yau Tong, Kwun Tong District, Kowloon, Hong Kong, located along Lei Yue Mun Road next to MTR Yau Tong station.

Yau Mei Court belongs to Yau Tong Estate Redevelopment Phase 3 and was completed in 2002. In 2002, Block A (Ching Mei Court) was converted to public rental housing after the Hong Kong Housing Authority decided to suspend HOS sales to the public. In 2005, seven blocks of the court were also converted to government quarters.

The remaining four blocks were collectively renamed Yau Chui Court. In 2009, one of the blocks, Block E, was sold to the public.

Houses

See also
Yau Tong Estate
Public housing estates in Yau Tong
Lei Yue Mun Plaza

References

Yau Tong
Home Ownership Scheme
Residential buildings completed in 2002
2002 establishments in Hong Kong